Wójcice may refer to the following places in Poland:
Wójcice, Lower Silesian Voivodeship (south-west Poland)
Wójcice, Łódź Voivodeship (central Poland)
Wójcice, Opole Voivodeship (south-west Poland)